Silver Lake is a surface-level light rail station operated by New Jersey Transit in Belleville Township, Essex County, New Jersey, United States. The station is the only one in Belleville, operating along the Grove Street–Newark Penn Station line of the Newark Light Rail. The station contains two low-level platforms that are off-centered. The Newark-bound platform is accessible from Franklin Street (County Route 607) and nearby Heckel Street while the Grove Street-bound platform is accessible from nearby Belmont Avenue. 

The current light rail station opened on June 22, 2002, as part of an extension of the Newark City Subway from nearby Branch Brook Park station to Grove Street in Bloomfield. The station uses former tracks of the New York and Greenwood Lake Railway's Orange Branch, which went from nearby Forest Hill in Newark to West Orange. Service on this line ended on June 20, 1955. Silver Lake boasted a full wooden station depot with a built-in railroad tower.

Transfers
New Jersey Transit buses: 27, 90

References

External links

 Franklin Street entrance from Google Maps Street View
 Belmont Avenue entrance from Google Maps Street View

Belleville, New Jersey
Newark Light Rail stations
Railway stations in the United States opened in 2002
Former Erie Railroad stations
Railway stations in Essex County, New Jersey
2002 establishments in New Jersey